Robert Waller  (c 1732–1814), was a British politician who sat in the House of Commons for 29 years from 1761 to 1790.

Waller was the son of Edmund Waller, MP of Beaconsfield and his wife Mary Aislabie, daughter of John Aislabie and the brother of MPs John Waller and Edmund Waller. He was possibly educated at Eton College from 1742 to 1748 and matriculated at Oriel College, Oxford aged 18 on 11 June 1751.

In the 1761 general election Waller was returned unopposed as Member of Parliament for Chipping Wycombe on his family interest. He was returned unopposed  at all his subsequent elections in 1768,  1774,  1780 and 1784. He was Groom of the Bedchamber from 1784 to 1801.

Waller lived at Hall Barn, near Beaconsfield in Buckinghamshire and died unmarried in October or November 1814.

References

1814 deaths
Alumni of Oriel College, Oxford
Members of the Parliament of Great Britain for English constituencies
British MPs 1761–1768
British MPs 1768–1774
British MPs 1774–1780
British MPs 1780–1784
British MPs 1784–1790
Year of birth uncertain